The coat of arms of Sydney was granted to the city on 30 July 1908 by England's College of Arms. It features a three-masted ship on a gold and blue background, along with symbols pertaining to various figures in Sydney's history (namely Viscount Sydney, Governor Phillip, Captain Cook, and Sir Thomas Hughes). The crest is an anchor encircled by a mural crown and surmounted by a six-pointed star, and the supporters are an Aboriginal and an 18th century British seaman. The motto is "I take but I surrender". An interpretation published alongside the grant of arms explains this as follows:

The English landing party took possession from the aborigine, and in turn surrendered it to that growing nationality of which the settlement of the City of Sydney was the foundation.

In 1996, the arms were extensively redesigned. The redesign simplified the arms, removing the motto and replacing the human supporters with a snake and a coiled rope. The snake represents the Rainbow Serpent, an Aboriginal creator-being. It is adorned with markings used by the Eora people, the original inhabitants of Port Jackson. The rope, a maritime symbol, "highlights the diverse cultural origins of the people of Sydney", and, entwined with the snake, "suggests cultural harmony".

History

From 1857 until 1908, the City of Sydney used variations on a design for the city seal by draughtsman M. de St Remy. This design, which was never officially granted, featured a shield with a rising sun, a common symbol in early Australian heraldry representing the growth of the new colony, and a ship, representing Sydney's maritime heritage. The sun was later replaced with a beehive, a traditional symbol of industry. Like later iterations of the arms, the design included an Aboriginal and a British sailor and the motto "I take but I surrender".

In 1902, Sir Thomas Hughes became the first Lord Mayor of Sydney. Hughes suggested that the council commission a new coat of arms and submit a petition to the College of Arms in London. The new arms, designed by William Frederic Ward, drew on de St Remy's design, but also included elements from the arms of Viscount Sidney and Captain Cook. The final version, granted in 1908, also included the arms of Hughes himself.

See also

 Flag of Sydney
 Coat of arms of New South Wales
 Australian heraldry

References

External links 
 Symbols of the city
Further information from the City Council

Sydney
Sydney
Australia
Sydney
Sydney
Sydney
Government of Sydney